Mkia wa Ng'ombe Ruins (Magofu ya mji wa Kale wa Mkia wa Ng'ombe in Swahili ) is protected historic site located inside Micheweni District of Pemba North Region in Tanzania. The settlement was established around the 15th CE and abandoned in the 16th century. There are ruins of a mosque, tombs and some stone buildings. The site is critically endangered to further erosion.

See also
Historic Swahili Settlements
Archaeology of Pemba Island

References

Swahili people
Swahili city-states
Swahili culture
Pemba Island